Ivan Rudnytskyi (born 5 July 1991) is a Ukrainian professional footballer.

Career
In 2016, he played for Neman Grodno.

References

External links 
 
 
 

1991 births
Living people
Ukrainian footballers
Ukrainian expatriate footballers
Expatriate footballers in Belarus
Expatriate footballers in Georgia (country)
Ukrainian expatriate sportspeople in Belarus
FC Zorya Luhansk players
FC Zirka Kropyvnytskyi players
FC Nyva Ternopil players
FC Neman Grodno players
FC Shukura Kobuleti players
PFC Sumy players
Association football midfielders
Ukrainian First League players
Sportspeople from Ternopil